An alternative fuel vehicle is a motor vehicle that runs on alternative fuel rather than traditional petroleum fuels (petrol or petrodiesel). The term also refers to any technology (e.g. electric car, hybrid electric vehicles, solar-powered vehicles) powering an engine that does not solely involve petroleum.  Because of a combination of factors, such as environmental concerns, high oil-prices and the potential for peak oil, development of cleaner alternative fuels and advanced power systems for vehicles has become a high priority for many governments and vehicle manufacturers around the world.

Vehicle engines powered by gasolene/petrol first emerged in the 1860s and 1870s; they took until the 1930s to completely dominate the original "alternative" engines driven by steam (18th century), by gases (early 19th century), or by electricity ( 1830s).

Hybrid electric vehicles such as the Toyota Prius are not actually alternative fuel vehicles, but through advanced technologies in the electric battery and motor/generator, they make a more efficient use of petroleum fuel. Other research-and-development efforts in alternative forms of power focus on developing all-electric and fuel cell vehicles, and even on the stored energy of compressed air.

An environmental analysis of the impacts of various vehicle-fuels extends beyond just operating efficiency and emissions, especially if a technology comes into wide use. A life-cycle assessment of a vehicle involves production and post-use considerations. A cradle-to-cradle design is more important than a focus on a single factor such as the type of fuel.

Global outlook 

, there were more than 1.4 billion motor vehicles on the world's roads, compared with just more than 116 million alternative fuel and advanced technology vehicles that had been sold or converted worldwide at the end of 2016 and consisting of:

 About 55 million flex fuel automobiles, motorcycles and light duty trucks manufactured and sold worldwide by mid 2015, led by Brazil with 29.5 million by mid 2015, followed by the United States with 17.4 million by the end of 2014, Canada with about 1.6 million by 2014, and Sweden with 243,100 through December 2014. The Brazilian flex fuel fleet includes over 4 million flexible-fuel motorcycles produced since 2009 through March 2015.
 22.7 million natural gas vehicles , led by China (4.4 million) Iran with 4.00 million, followed by Pakistan (3.70 million), Argentina (2.48 million), India (1.80 million) and Brazil (1.78 million).
 24.9 million LPG powered vehicles by December 2013, led by Turkey with 3.93 million, South Korea (2.4 million), and Poland (2.75 million).
 More than 12 million hybrid electric vehicles have been sold worldwide. , Japan ranked as the market leader with more than 5 million hybrids sold, followed by the United States with cumulative sales of over 4 million units since 1999, and Europe with about 1.5 million hybrids delivered since 2000. , global sales are by Toyota Motor Company with more than 10 million Lexus and Toyota hybrids sold, followed by Honda Motor Co., Ltd. with cumulative global sales of more than 1.35 million hybrids . , global hybrid sales are led by the Prius family, with cumulative sales of  6.1 million units. The Toyota Prius liftback is the world's top selling hybrid electric car with cumulative sales of 3.985 million units through January 2017.
5.7 million neat-ethanol only light-vehicles built in Brazil since 1979, with 2.4 to 3.0 million vehicles still in use by 2003. and 1.22 million units as of December 2011.

 More than 10 million highway-legal plug-in electric passenger cars and light utility vehicles had been sold worldwide at the end of 2020.  , the Tesla Model 3 listed as the world's top selling highway-capable plug-in electric car in history, with global sales since inception of more than 800,000 units, followed by the Nissan Leaf with 500,000 units. The Mitsubishi Outlander P-HEV is the world's all-time best selling plug-in hybrid with global sales of 270,000 units through December 2020.

, China had the world's largest stock of highway legal plug-in electric passenger cars with 4.5 million units, representing 42% of the world's stock of plug-in cars. Europe ranked next with over 3.2 million plug-in passenger cars at the end of 2020, accounting for about 30% of the global stock. The U.S. cumulative sales totaled about 1.8 million plug-in cars through December 2020.

 There were 31,225 passenger fuel cell electric vehicles (FCEV) powered with hydrogen on the world's roads. South Korea is the country market with the largest stock of passenger FCEVs with 10,041 units, followed by the United States (9,135), China (5,546) and Japan (4,100).

Single fuel source

Engine air compressor 

The air engine is an emission-free piston engine that uses compressed air as a source of energy.  The first compressed air car was invented by a French engineer named Guy Nègre. The expansion of compressed air may be used to drive the pistons in a modified piston engine.  Efficiency of operation is gained through the use of environmental heat at normal temperature to warm the otherwise cold expanded air from the storage tank. This non-adiabatic expansion has the potential to greatly increase the efficiency of the machine.  The only exhaust is cold air (−15 °C), which could also be used to air condition the car.  The source for air is a pressurized carbon-fiber tank. Air is delivered to the engine via a rather conventional injection system. Unique crank design within the engine increases the time during which the air charge is warmed from ambient sources and a two-stage process allows improved heat transfer rates.

Electric, fed by external source 
Electric power fed from an external source to the vehicle is standard in railway electrification. At such systems usually the tracks form one pole, while the other is usually a single overhead wire or a rail insulated against ground.

On roads this system does not work as described, as normal road surfaces are very poor electric conductors; and so electric vehicles fed with external power on roads require at least two overhead wires. The most common type of road vehicles fed with electricity from external source are trolleybusses, but there are also some trucks powered with this technology. The advantage is that the vehicle can be operated without breaks for refueling or charging. Disadvantages include: a large infrastructure of electric wires; difficulty in driving as one has to prevent a dewirement of the vehicle; vehicles cannot overtake each other; a danger of electrocution; and an aesthetic problem.

Wireless transmission (see Wireless power transfer) is possible, in principal; but the infrastructure (especially wiring) necessary for inductive or capacitive coupling would be extensive and expensive. In principle it is also possible to transmit energy by microwaves or by lasers to the vehicle, but this may be inefficient and dangerous for the power required. Beside this, in the case of lasers one requires a guidance system to track the vehicle to be powered, as laser beams have a small diameter.

Battery-electric 

Battery electric vehicles (BEVs), also known as all-electric vehicles (AEVs), are electric vehicles whose main energy storage is in the chemical energy of batteries. BEVs are the most common form of what is defined by the California Air Resources Board (CARB) as zero emission vehicle (ZEV) because they produce no tailpipe emissions at the point of operation. The electrical energy carried on board a BEV to power the motors is obtained from a variety of battery chemistries arranged into battery packs. For additional range genset trailers or pusher trailers are sometimes used, forming a type of hybrid vehicle. Batteries used in electric vehicles include "flooded" lead-acid, absorbed glass mat, NiCd, nickel metal hydride, Li-ion, Li-poly and zinc-air batteries.

Attempts at building viable, modern battery-powered electric vehicles began in the 1950s with the introduction of the first modern (transistor controlled) electric car – the Henney Kilowatt, even though the concept was out in the market since 1890. Despite the poor sales of the early battery-powered vehicles, development of various battery-powered vehicles continued through the mid-1990s, with such models as the General Motors EV1 and the Toyota RAV4 EV.

Battery powered cars had primarily used lead-acid batteries and NiMH batteries. Lead-acid batteries' recharge capacity is considerably reduced if they're discharged beyond 75% on a regular basis, making them a less-than-ideal solution. NiMH batteries are a better choice, but are considerably more expensive than lead-acid. Lithium-ion battery powered vehicles such as the Venturi Fetish and the Tesla Roadster have recently demonstrated excellent performance and range, and nevertheless is used in most mass production models launched since December 2010.

Expanding on traditional Lithium-ion batteries predominately used in today's battery electric vehicles, is an emerging science that is paving the way to utilize a carbon fiber structure (a vehicle body or chassis in this case) as a structural battery. Experiments being conducted at the Chalmers University of Technology in Sweden are showing that when coupled with Lithium-ion insertion mechanisms, an enhanced carbon fiber structure can have electromechanical properties. This means that the carbon fiber structure itself can act as its own battery/power source for propulsion. This would negate the need for traditional heavy battery banks, reducing weight and therefore increasing fuel efficiency.

, several neighborhood electric vehicles, city electric cars and series production highway-capable electric cars and utility vans have been made available for retails sales, including Tesla Roadster, GEM cars, Buddy, Mitsubishi i MiEV and its rebadged versions Peugeot iOn and Citroën C-Zero, Chery QQ3 EV, JAC J3 EV, Nissan Leaf, Smart ED, Mia electric, BYD e6, Renault Kangoo Z.E., Bolloré Bluecar, Renault Fluence Z.E., Ford Focus Electric, BMW ActiveE, Renault Twizy, Tesla Model S, Honda Fit EV, RAV4 EV second generation, Renault Zoe, Mitsubishi Minicab MiEV, Roewe E50, Chevrolet Spark EV, Fiat 500e, BMW i3, Volkswagen e-Up!, Nissan e-NV200, Volkswagen e-Golf, Mercedes-Benz B-Class Electric Drive, Kia Soul EV, BYD e5, and Tesla Model X. The world's all-time top selling highway legal electric car is the Nissan Leaf, released in December 2010, with global sales of more than 250,000 units through December 2016. The Tesla Model S, released in June 2012, ranks second with global sales of over 158,000 cars delivered . The Renault Kangoo Z.E. utility van is the leader of the light-duty all-electric segment with global sales of 25,205 units through December 2016.

Electric, stored-otherway 

Electricity can be also stored in supercapacitors and supraconductors. However supraconductor storage is unsuitable for vehicle propulsion as it requires extreme deep temperature and produces strong magnetic fields. Supercapacitors, however, can be used in vehicles and are used in some trams on sections without overhead wire. They can be load in during regular stops, at which passengers enter and leave the train, but can only travel a few kilometres with the stored energy. However, this is no problem in this case as the next stop is usually in reachable distance.

Solar 

A solar car is an electric vehicle powered by solar energy obtained from solar panels on the car. Solar panels cannot currently be used to directly supply a car with a suitable amount of power at this time, but they can be used to extend the range of electric vehicles. They are raced in competitions such as the World Solar Challenge and the North American Solar Challenge. These events are often sponsored by Government agencies such as the United States Department of Energy keen to promote the development of alternative energy technology such as solar cells and electric vehicles. Such challenges are often entered by universities to develop their students' engineering and technological skills as well as motor vehicle manufacturers such as GM and Honda.

The North American Solar Challenge is a solar car race across North America. Originally called Sunrayce, organized and sponsored by General Motors in 1990, it was renamed American Solar Challenge in 2001, sponsored by the United States Department of Energy and the National Renewable Energy Laboratory.  Teams from universities in the United States and Canada compete in a long distance test of endurance as well as efficiency, driving thousands of miles on regular highways.

Nuna is the name of a series of manned solar powered vehicles that won the World solar challenge in Australia three times in a row, in 2001 (Nuna 1 or just Nuna), 2003 (Nuna 2) and 2005 (Nuna 3). The Nunas are built by students of the Delft University of Technology.

The World solar challenge is a solar powered car race over  through central Australia from Darwin to Adelaide. The race attracts teams from around the world, most of which are fielded by universities or corporations although some are fielded by high schools.

Trev (two-seater renewable energy vehicle) was designed by the staff and students at the University of South Australia. Trev was first displayed at the 2005 World Solar Challenge as the concept of a low-mass, efficient commuter car. With 3 wheels and a mass of about 300 kg, the prototype car had maximum speed of 120 km/h and acceleration of 0–100 km/h in about 10 seconds. The running cost of Trev is projected to be less than 1/10 of the running cost of a small petrol car.

Dimethyl ether fuel

Dimethyl ether (DME) is a promising fuel in diesel engines, petrol engines (30% DME / 70% LPG), and gas turbines owing to its high cetane number, which is 55, compared to diesel's, which is 40–53. Only moderate modifications are needed to convert a diesel engine to burn DME. The simplicity of this short carbon chain compound leads during combustion to very low emissions of particulate matter, NOx, CO. For these reasons as well as being sulfur-free, DME meets even the most stringent emission regulations in Europe (EURO5), U.S. (U.S. 2010), and Japan (2009 Japan). Mobil is using DME in their methanol to gasoline process.

DME is being developed as a synthetic second generation biofuel (BioDME), which can be manufactured from lignocellulosic biomass. Currently the EU is considering BioDME in its potential biofuel mix in 2030; the Volvo Group is the coordinator for the European Community Seventh Framework Programme project BioDME where Chemrec's BioDME pilot plant based on black liquor gasification is nearing completion in Piteå, Sweden.

Ammonia fuelled vehicles

Ammonia is produced by combining gaseous hydrogen with nitrogen from the air. Large-scale ammonia production uses natural gas for the source of hydrogen. Ammonia was used during World War II to power buses in Belgium, and in engine and solar energy applications prior to 1900. Liquid ammonia also fuelled the Reaction Motors XLR99 rocket engine, that powered the X-15 hypersonic research aircraft. Although not as powerful as other fuels, it left no soot in the reusable rocket engine and its density approximately matches the density of the oxidizer, liquid oxygen, which simplified the aircraft's design.

Ammonia has been proposed as a practical alternative to fossil fuel for internal combustion engines. The calorific value of ammonia is 22.5 MJ/kg (9690 BTU/lb), which is about half that of diesel. In a normal engine, in which the water vapour is not condensed, the calorific value of ammonia will be about 21% less than this figure. It can be used in existing engines with only minor modifications to carburettors/injectors.

If produced from coal, the CO2 can be readily sequestered (the combustion products are nitrogen and water).

Ammonia engines or ammonia motors, using ammonia as a working fluid, have been proposed and occasionally used. The principle is similar to that used in a fireless locomotive, but with ammonia as the working fluid, instead of steam or compressed air. Ammonia engines were used experimentally in the 19th century by Goldsworthy Gurney in the UK and in streetcars in New Orleans. In 1981 a Canadian company converted a 1981 Chevrolet Impala to operate using ammonia as fuel.

It can be made from renewable electricity, and having half the density of petrol or diesel can be readily carried in sufficient quantities in vehicles. On complete combustion it has no emissions other than nitrogen and water vapour. The combustion chemical formula is 4 NH3 + 3 O2 → 2 N2 + 6 H2O, 75% water is the result.

Biofuels

Bioalcohol and ethanol 

The first commercial vehicle that used ethanol as a fuel was the Ford Model T, produced from 1908 through 1927. It was fitted with a carburetor with adjustable jetting, allowing use of gasoline or ethanol, or a combination of both. Other car manufactures also provided engines for ethanol fuel use. In the United States, alcohol fuel was produced in corn-alcohol stills until Prohibition criminalized the production of alcohol in 1919. The use of alcohol as a fuel for internal combustion engines, either alone or in combination with other fuels, lapsed until the oil price shocks of the 1970s. Furthermore, additional attention was gained because of its possible environmental and long-term economical advantages over fossil fuel.

Both ethanol and methanol have been used as an automotive fuel.  While both can be obtained from petroleum or natural gas, ethanol has attracted more attention because it is considered a renewable resource, easily obtained from sugar or starch in crops and other agricultural produce such as grain, sugarcane, sugar beets or even lactose. Since ethanol occurs in nature whenever yeast happens to find a sugar solution such as overripe fruit, most organisms have evolved some tolerance to ethanol, whereas methanol is toxic. Other experiments involve butanol, which can also be produced by fermentation of plants. Support for ethanol comes from the fact that it is a biomass fuel, which addresses climate change and greenhouse gas emissions, though these benefits are now highly debated, including the heated 2008 food vs fuel debate.

Most modern cars are designed to run on gasoline are capable of running with a blend from 10% up to 15% ethanol mixed into gasoline (E10-E15). With a small amount of redesign, gasoline-powered vehicles can run on ethanol concentrations as high as 85% (E85), the maximum set in the United States and Europe due to cold weather during the winter, or up to 100% (E100) in Brazil, with a warmer climate. Ethanol has close to 34% less energy per volume than gasoline, consequently fuel economy ratings with ethanol blends are significantly lower than with pure gasoline, but this lower energy content does not translate directly into a 34% reduction in mileage, because there are many other variables that affect the performance of a particular fuel in a particular engine, and also because ethanol has a higher octane rating which is beneficial to high compression ratio engines.

For this reason, for pure or high ethanol blends to be attractive for users, its price must be lower than gasoline to offset the lower fuel economy. As a rule of thumb, Brazilian consumers are frequently advised by the local media to use more alcohol than gasoline in their mix only when ethanol prices are 30% lower or more than gasoline, as ethanol price fluctuates heavily depending on the results and seasonal harvests of sugar cane and by region. In the US, and based on EPA tests for all 2006 E85 models, the average fuel economy for E85 vehicles was found 25.56% lower than unleaded gasoline. The EPA-rated mileage of current American flex-fuel vehicles could be considered when making price comparisons, though E85 has octane rating of about 104 and could be used as a substitute for premium gasoline. Regional retail E85 prices vary widely across the US, with more favorable prices in the Midwest region, where most corn is grown and ethanol produced. In August 2008 the US average spread between the price of E85 and gasoline was 16.9%, while in Indiana was 35%, 30% in Minnesota and Wisconsin, 19% in Maryland, 12 to 15% in California, and just 3% in Utah. Depending on the vehicle capabilities, the break even price of E85 usually has to be between 25 and 30% lower than gasoline.

Reacting to the high price of oil and its growing dependence on imports, in 1975 Brazil launched the Pro-alcool program, a huge government-subsidized effort to manufacture ethanol fuel (from its sugar cane crop) and ethanol-powered automobiles.  These ethanol-only vehicles were very popular in the 1980s, but became economically impractical when oil prices fell – and sugar prices rose – late in that decade.  In May 2003 Volkswagen built for the first time a commercial ethanol flexible fuel car, the Gol 1.6 Total Flex. These vehicles were a commercial success and by early 2009 other nine Brazilian manufacturers are producing flexible fuel vehicles: Chevrolet, Fiat, Ford, Peugeot, Renault, Honda, Mitsubishi, Toyota, Citroën, and Nissan. The adoption of the flex technology was so rapid, that flexible fuel cars reached 87.6% of new car sales in July 2008. As of August 2008, the fleet of "flex" automobiles and light commercial vehicles had reached 6 million new vehicles sold, representing almost 19% of all registered light vehicles. The rapid success of "flex" vehicles, as they are popularly known, was made possible by the existence of 33,000 filling stations with at least one ethanol pump available by 2006, a heritage of the Pro-alcool program.

In the United States, initial support to develop alternative fuels by the government was also a response to the 1973 oil crisis, and later on, as a goal to improve air quality. Also, liquid fuels were preferred over gaseous fuels not only because they have a better volumetric energy density but also because they were the most compatible fuels with existing distribution systems and engines, thus avoiding a big departure from the existing technologies and taking advantage of the vehicle and the refueling infrastructure. California led the search of sustainable alternatives with interest in methanol.
In 1996, a new FFV Ford Taurus was developed, with models fully capable of running either methanol or ethanol blended with gasoline. This ethanol version of the Taurus was the first commercial production of an E85 FFV.  The momentum of the FFV production programs at the American car companies continued, although by the end of the 1990s, the emphasis was on the FFV E85 version, as it is today. Ethanol was preferred over methanol because there is a large support in the farming community and thanks to government's incentive programs and corn-based ethanol subsidies. Sweden also tested both the M85 and the E85 flexifuel vehicles, but due to agriculture policy, in the end emphasis was given to the ethanol flexifuel vehicles.

Biodiesel 

The main benefit of Diesel combustion engines is that they have a 44% fuel burn efficiency; compared with just 25–30% in the best gasoline engines. In addition diesel fuel has slightly higher energy density by volume than gasoline. This makes Diesel engines capable of achieving much better fuel economy than gasoline vehicles.

Biodiesel (fatty acid methyl ester), is commercially available in most oilseed-producing states in the United States. As of 2005, it is somewhat more expensive than fossil diesel, though it is still commonly produced in relatively small quantities (in comparison to petroleum products and ethanol). Many farmers who raise oilseeds use a biodiesel blend in tractors and equipment as a matter of policy, to foster production of biodiesel and raise public awareness. It is sometimes easier to find biodiesel in rural areas than in cities. Biodiesel has lower energy density than fossil diesel fuel, so biodiesel vehicles are not quite able to keep up with the fuel economy of a fossil fuelled diesel vehicle, if the diesel injection system is not reset for the new fuel. If the injection timing is changed to take account of the higher cetane value of biodiesel, the difference in economy is negligible. Because biodiesel contains more oxygen than diesel or vegetable oil fuel, it produces the lowest emissions from diesel engines, and is lower in most emissions than gasoline engines. Biodiesel has a higher lubricity than mineral diesel and is an additive in European pump diesel for lubricity and emissions reduction.

Some Diesel-powered cars can run with minor modifications on 100% pure vegetable oils. Vegetable oils tend to thicken (or solidify if it is waste cooking oil), in cold weather conditions so vehicle modifications (a two tank system with diesel start/stop tank), are essential in order to heat the fuel prior to use under most circumstances.  Heating to the temperature of engine coolant reduces fuel viscosity, to the range cited by injection system manufacturers, for systems prior to 'common rail' or 'unit injection ( VW PD)' systems. Waste vegetable oil, especially if it has been used for a long time, may become hydrogenated and have increased acidity. This can cause the thickening of fuel, gumming in the engine and acid damage of the fuel system. Biodiesel does not have this problem, because it is chemically processed to be PH neutral and lower viscosity. Modern low emission diesels (most often Euro -3 and -4 compliant), typical of the current production in the European industry, would require extensive modification of injector system, pumps and seals etc. due to the higher operating pressures, that are designed thinner (heated) mineral diesel than ever before, for atomisation, if they were to use pure vegetable oil as fuel. Vegetable oil fuel is not suitable for these vehicles as they are currently produced. This reduces the market as increasing numbers of new vehicles are not able to use it. However, the German Elsbett company has successfully produced single tank vegetable oil fuel systems for several decades, and has worked with Volkswagen on their TDI engines. This shows that it is technologically possible to use vegetable oil as a fuel in high efficiency / low emission diesel engines.

Greasestock is an event held yearly in Yorktown Heights, New York, and is one of the largest showcases of vehicles using waste oil as a biofuel in the United States.

Biogas 

Compressed biogas may be used for internal combustion engines after purification of the raw gas. The removal of H2O, H2S and particles can be seen as standard producing a gas which has the same quality as compressed natural gas. The use of biogas is particularly interesting for climates where the waste heat of a biogas powered power plant cannot be used during the summer.

Charcoal 
In the 1930s Tang Zhongming made an invention using abundant charcoal resources for Chinese auto market. The charcoal-fuelled car was later used intensively in China, serving the army and conveyancer after the breakout of World War II.

Compressed natural gas 

High-pressure compressed natural gas (CNG), mainly composed of methane, that is used to fuel normal combustion engines instead of gasoline. Combustion of methane produces the least amount of CO2 of all fossil fuels. Gasoline cars can be retrofitted to CNG and become bifuel Natural gas vehicles (NGVs) as the gasoline tank is kept. The driver can switch between CNG and gasoline during operation. Natural gas vehicles (NGVs) are popular in regions or countries where natural gas is abundant. Widespread use began in the Po River Valley of Italy, and later became very popular in New Zealand by the eighties, though its use has declined.

, there were 17.8 million natural gas vehicles worldwide, led by Iran with 3.30 million, followed by Pakistan (2.79 million), Argentina (2.29 million), Brazil (1.75 million), China (1.58 million) and India (1.5 million). As of 2010, the Asia-Pacific region led the global market with a share of 54%.  In Europe they are popular in Italy (730,000), Ukraine (200,000), Armenia (101,352), Russia (100,000) and Germany (91,500), and they are becoming more so as various manufacturers produce factory made cars, buses, vans and heavy vehicles. In the United States CNG powered buses are the favorite choice of several public transit agencies, with an estimated CNG bus fleet of some 130,000. Other countries where CNG-powered buses are popular include India, Australia, Argentina, and Germany.

CNG vehicles are common in South America, where these vehicles are mainly used as taxicabs in main cities of Argentina and Brazil. Normally, standard gasoline vehicles are retrofitted in specialized shops, which involve installing the gas cylinder in the trunk and the CNG injection system and electronics. The Brazilian GNV fleet is concentrated in the cities of Rio de Janeiro and São Paulo. Pike Research reports that almost 90% of NGVs in Latin America have bi-fuel engines, allowing these vehicles to run on either gasoline or CNG.

In 2006 the Brazilian subsidiary of FIAT introduced the Fiat Siena Tetra fuel, a four-fuel car developed under Magneti Marelli of Fiat Brazil. This automobile can run on 100% ethanol (E100), E25 (Brazil's normal ethanol gasoline blend), pure gasoline (not available in Brazil), and natural gas, and switches from the gasoline-ethanol blend to CNG automatically, depending on the power required by road conditions. Other existing option is to retrofit an ethanol flexible-fuel vehicle to add a natural gas tank and the corresponding injection system. Some taxicabs in São Paulo and Rio de Janeiro, Brazil, run on this option, allowing the user to choose among three fuels (E25, E100 and CNG) according to current market prices at the pump. Vehicles with this adaptation are known in Brazil as "tri-fuel" cars.

HCNG or hydrogen enriched compressed natural gas for automobile use is premixed at the hydrogen station.

Liquefied natural gas 

Liquefied natural gas (LNG) is natural gas that has been cooled to a point at which it becomes a cryogenic liquid. In this liquid state, natural gas is more than 2 times as dense as highly compressed CNG. LNG fuel systems function on any vehicle capable of burning natural gas. Unlike CNG, which is stored at high pressure (typically 3000 or 3600 psi) and then regulated to a lower pressure that the engine can accept, LNG is stored at low pressure (50 to 150 psi) and simply vaporized by a heat exchanger before entering the fuel metering devices to the engine. Because of its high energy density compared to CNG, it is very suitable for those interested in long ranges while running on natural gas.

In the United States, the LNG supply chain is the main thing that has held back this fuel source from growing rapidly. The LNG supply chain is very analogous to that of diesel or gasoline. First, pipeline natural gas is liquefied in large quantities, which is analogous to refining gasoline or diesel. Then, the LNG is transported via semi trailer to fuel stations where it is stored in bulk tanks until it is dispensed into a vehicle. CNG, on the other hand, requires expensive compression at each station to fill the high-pressure cylinder cascades.

Autogas 

LPG or liquefied petroleum gas (LPG) is a low pressure liquefied gas mixture composed mainly of propane and butane which burns in conventional gasoline combustion engines with less CO2 than gasoline. Gasoline cars can be retrofitted to LPG aka Autogas and become bifuel vehicles as the gasoline tank is not removed, allowing drivers to switch between LPG and gasoline during operation. Estimated 10 million vehicles running worldwide.

There are 17.473 million LPG powered vehicles worldwide as of December 2010, and the leading countries are Turkey (2.394 million vehicles), Poland (2.325 million), and South Korea (2.3 million). In the U.S., 190,000 on-road vehicles use propane, and 450,000 forklifts use it for power. However, it is banned in Pakistan (DEC 2013) as it is considered a risk to public safety by OGRA.

Hyundai Motor Company began sales of the Elantra LPI Hybrid in the South Korean domestic market in July 2009. The Elantra LPI (Liquefied Petroleum Injected) is the world's first hybrid electric vehicle to be powered by an internal combustion engine built to run on liquefied petroleum gas (LPG) as a fuel.

Formic acid 

Formic acid is used by converting it first to hydrogen, and using that in a hydrogen fuel cell. It can also be used directly in formic acid fuel cells. Formic acid is much easier to store than hydrogen.

Hydrogen 

A hydrogen car is an automobile which uses hydrogen as its primary source of power for locomotion. These cars generally use the hydrogen in one of two methods: combustion or fuel-cell conversion. In combustion, the hydrogen is "burned" in engines in fundamentally the same method as traditional gasoline cars. In fuel-cell conversion, the hydrogen is turned into electricity through fuel cells which then powers electric motors. With either method, the only byproduct from the spent hydrogen is water, however during combustion with air NOx can be produced.

Honda introduced its fuel cell vehicle in 1999 called the FCX and have since then introduced the second generation FCX Clarity. Limited marketing of the FCX Clarity, based on the 2007 concept model, began in June 2008 in the United States, and it was introduced in Japan in November 2008.  The FCX Clarity was available in the U.S. only in Los Angeles Area, where 16 hydrogen filling stations are available, and until July 2009, only 10 drivers have leased the Clarity for US$600 a month. At the 2012 World Hydrogen Energy Conference, Daimler AG, Honda, Hyundai and Toyota all confirmed plans to produce hydrogen fuel cell vehicles for sale by 2015, with some types planned to enter the showroom in 2013. From 2008 to 2014, Honda leased a total of 45 FCX units in the US.

A small number of prototype hydrogen cars currently exist, and a significant amount of research is underway to make the technology more viable.  The common internal combustion engine, usually fueled with gasoline (petrol) or diesel liquids, can be converted to run on gaseous hydrogen.  However, the most efficient use of hydrogen involves the use of fuel cells and electric motors instead of a traditional engine.  Hydrogen reacts with oxygen inside the fuel cells, which produces electricity to power the motors.  One primary area of research is hydrogen storage, to try to increase the range of hydrogen vehicles while reducing the weight, energy consumption, and complexity of the storage systems.  Two primary methods of storage are metal hydrides and compression.  Some believe that hydrogen cars will never be economically viable and that the emphasis on this technology is a diversion from the development and popularization of more efficient hybrid cars and other alternative technologies.

A study by The Carbon Trust for the UK Department of Energy and Climate Change suggests that hydrogen technologies have the potential to deliver UK transport with near-zero emissions whilst reducing dependence on imported oil and curtailment of renewable generation. However, the technologies face very difficult challenges, in terms of cost, performance and policy.

Buses, trains, PHB bicycles, canal boats, cargo bikes, golf carts, motorcycles, wheelchairs, ships, airplanes, submarines, and rockets can already run on hydrogen, in various forms. NASA used hydrogen to launch Space Shuttles into space. A working toy model car runs on solar power, using a regenerative fuel cell to store energy in the form of hydrogen and oxygen gas. It can then convert the fuel back into water to release the solar energy.

BMW's Clean Energy internal combustion hydrogen car has more power and is faster than hydrogen fuel cell electric cars. A limited series production of the 7 Series Saloon was announced as commencing at the end of 2006. A BMW hydrogen prototype (H2R) using the driveline of this model broke the speed record for hydrogen cars at 300 km/h (186 mi/h), making automotive history. Mazda has developed Wankel engines to burn hydrogen. The Wankel uses a rotary principle of operation, so the hydrogen burns in a different part of the engine from the intake. This reduces pre-detonation, a problem with hydrogen fueled piston engines.

The other major car companies like Daimler, Chrysler, Honda, Toyota, Ford and General Motors, are investing in hydrogen fuel cells instead. VW, Nissan, and Hyundai/Kia also have fuel cell vehicle prototypes on the road. In addition, transit agencies across the globe are running prototype fuel cell buses.

The Hyundai ix35 FCEV fuel cell vehicle is available for lease in the U.S.  In 2014, a total of 54 units were leased. Sales of the Toyota Mirai to government and corporate customers began in Japan on December 15, 2014.  Toyota delivered the first market placed Mirai to the Prime Minister's Official Residence and announced it got 1,500 orders in Japan in one month after sales began against a sales target of 400 for 12 months.

Deliveries to retail customers began in California in October 2015. A total of 57 units were delivered between October and November 2015. Toyota scheduled to release the Mirai in the Northeastern States in the first half of 2016. The market launch in Europe is slated for September 2015.

Liquid nitrogen car 

Liquid nitrogen (LN2) is a method of storing energy. Energy is used to liquefy air, and then LN2 is produced by evaporation, and distributed. LN2 is exposed to ambient heat in the car and the resulting nitrogen gas can be used to power a piston or turbine engine. The maximum amount of energy that can be extracted from LN2 is 213 Watt-hours per kg (W·h/kg) or 173 W·h per liter, in which a maximum of 70 W·h/kg can be utilized with an isothermal expansion process. Such a vehicle with a 350-liter (93 gallon) tank can achieve ranges similar to a gasoline powered vehicle with a 50-liter (13 gallon) tank. Theoretical future engines, using cascading topping cycles, can improve this to around 110 W·h/kg with a quasi-isothermal expansion process. The advantages are zero harmful emissions and superior energy densities compared to a compressed-air vehicle as well as being able to refill the tank in a matter of minutes.

Nuclear power 

In principle, it is possible to build a vehicle powered by nuclear fission or nuclear decay. However, there are two major problems: first one has to transform the energy, which comes as heat and radiation into energy usable for a drive. One possible would be to use a steam turbine as in a nuclear power plant, but such a device would take too much space. A more suitable way would be direct conversion into electricity for example with thermoelements or thermionic devices. The second problem is that nuclear fission produces high levels of neutron and gamma rays, which require excessive shielding, that would result in a vehicle too large for use on public roads. However studies were made in this way by Ford Nucleon.

A better way for a nuclear powered vehicle would be the use of power of radioactive decay in radioisotope thermoelectric generators, which are also very safe and reliable. The required shielding of these devices depends on the used radio nuclide. Plutonium-238 as nearly pure alpha radiator does not require much shielding.
As prices for suitable radionuclide are high and energy density is low (generating 1 watt with Plutonium-238 requires a half gram of it), this way of propulsion is too expensive for wide use. Also radioisotope thermoelectric generators offer according to their large content of high radioactive material an extreme danger in case of misuse for example by terrorists. The only vehicle in use, which is driven by radioisotope thermoelectric generators is the Mars rover Curiosity.

Other forms of nuclear power as fusion and annihilation are at present not available for vehicle propulsion, as no working fusion reactor is available and it is questionable if one can ever built one with a size suitable for a road vehicle. Annihilation may perhaps work in some ways (see antimatter drive), but there is no technology existing to produce and store enough antimatter.

Flywheels 
Flywheels can be also used for alternative fuel and were used in the 1950s for the propulsion of buses in Switzerland, the such called gyrobuses. The flywheel of the bus was loaded up by electric power at the terminals of the line and allowed it to travel a way up to 8 kilometres just with its flywheel. Flywheel-powered vehicles are quieter than vehicles with combustion engine, require no overhead wire and generate no exhausts, but the flywheel device has a great weight (1.5 tons for 5 kWh) and requires special safety measures due to its high rotational speed.

Silanes 
Silanes higher than heptasilane can be stored like gasoline and may also work as fuel. They have the advantage that they can also burn with the nitrogen of the air, but have as major disadvantage its high price and that its combustion products are solid, which gives trouble in combustion engines.

Spring 
The power of wound-up springs or twisted rubber cords can be used for the propulsion of small vehicles. However this way of energy storage allows only saving small energy amounts not suitable for the propulsion of vehicles for transporting people. Spring-powered vehicles are wind-up toys or mousetrap cars.

Steam 

A steam car is a car that has a steam engine. Wood, coal, ethanol, or others can be used as fuel. The fuel is burned in a boiler and the heat converts water into steam. When the water turns to steam, it expands. The expansion creates pressure. The pressure pushes the pistons back and forth. This turns the driveshaft to spin the wheels which provides moves the car forward. It works like a coal-fueled steam train, or steam boat. The steam car was the next logical step in independent transport.

Steam cars take a long time to start, but some can reach speeds over 100 mph (161 km/h) eventually.  The late model Doble steam cars could be brought to operational condition in less than 30 seconds, had high top speeds and fast acceleration, but were expensive to buy.

A steam engine uses external combustion, as opposed to internal combustion. Gasoline-powered cars are more efficient at about 25–28% efficiency. In theory, a combined cycle steam engine in which the burning material is first used to drive a gas turbine can produce 50% to 60% efficiency. However, practical examples of steam engined cars work at only around 5–8% efficiency.

The best known and best selling steam-powered car was the Stanley Steamer. It used a compact fire-tube boiler under the hood to power a simple two-piston engine which was connected directly to the rear axle. Before Henry Ford introduced monthly payment financing with great success, cars were typically purchased outright. This is why the Stanley was kept simple; to keep the purchase price affordable.

Steam produced in refrigeration also can be use by a turbine in other vehicle types to produce electricity, that can be employed in electric motors or stored in a battery.

Steam power can be combined with a standard oil-based engine to create a hybrid. Water is injected into the cylinder after the fuel is burned, when the piston is still superheated, often at temperatures of 1500 degrees or more. The water will instantly be vaporized into steam, taking advantage of the heat that would otherwise be wasted.

Wind 

Wind-powered vehicles have been well-known for a long time. They can be realized with sails similar to those used on ships, by using an onboard wind turbine, which drives the wheels directly or which generates electricity for an electric motor, or can be pulled by a kite. Wind-powered land vehicles need an enormous clearance in height, especially when sails or kites are used and are unsuitable in urban area. They may be also be difficult to steer.
Wind-powered vehicles are only used for recreational activities on beaches or other free areas. 

The concept is described in further detail here: .

Wood gas 

Wood gas can be used to power cars with ordinary internal combustion engines if a wood gasifier is attached. This was quite popular during World War II in several European and Asian countries because the war prevented easy and cost-effective access to oil.

Herb Hartman of Woodward, Iowa currently drives a wood powered Cadillac. He claims to have attached the gasifier to the Cadillac for just $700. Hartman claims, "A full hopper will go about fifty miles depending on how you drive it," and he added that splitting the wood was "labor-intensive. That's the big drawback."

Multiple fuel source

Dual fuel 
Dual fuel vehicle is referred as the vehicle using two types of fuel in the same time (can be gas + liquid, gas + gas, liquid + liquid) with different fuel tank.

Diesel-CNG dual fuel is a system using two type of fuel which are diesel and compressed natural gas (CNG) at the same time. It is because of CNG need a source of ignition for combustion in diesel engine.

Flexible fuel 

A flexible-fuel vehicle (FFV) or dual-fuel vehicle (DFF) is an alternative fuel automobile or light duty truck with a multifuel engine that can use more than one fuel, usually mixed in the same tank, and the blend is burned in the combustion chamber together. These vehicles are colloquially called flex-fuel, or flexifuel in Europe, or just flex in Brazil. FFVs are distinguished from bi-fuel vehicles, where two fuels are stored in separate tanks. The most common commercially available FFV in the world market is the ethanol flexible-fuel vehicle, with the major markets concentrated in the United States, Brazil, Sweden, and some other European countries. In addition to flex-fuel vehicles running with ethanol, in the US and Europe there were successful test programs with methanol flex-fuel vehicles, known as M85 FFVs, and more recently there have been also successful tests using p-series fuels with E85 flex fuel vehicles, but as of June 2008, this fuel is not yet available to the general public.

Ethanol flexible-fuel vehicles have standard gasoline engines that are capable of running with ethanol and gasoline mixed in the same tank.  These mixtures have "E" numbers which describe the percentage of ethanol in the mixture, for example, E85 is 85% ethanol and 15% gasoline. (See common ethanol fuel mixtures for more information.) Though technology exists to allow ethanol FFVs to run on any mixture up to E100, in the U.S. and Europe, flex-fuel vehicles are optimized to run on E85. This limit is set to avoid cold starting problems during very cold weather. The alcohol content might be reduced during the winter, to E70 in the U.S. or to E75 in Sweden. Brazil, with a warmer climate, developed vehicles that can run on any mix up to E100, though E20-E25 is the mandatory minimum blend, and no pure gasoline is sold in the country.

About 48 million automobiles, motorcycles and light duty trucks manufactured and sold worldwide by mid 2015, and concentrated in four markets, Brazil (29.5 million by mid 2015), the United States (17.4 million by the end of 2014), Canada (1.6 million by 2014), and Sweden (243,100 through December 2014). The Brazilian flex fuel fleet includes over 4 million flexible-fuel motorcycles produced since 2009 through March 2015. In Brazil, 65% of flex-fuel car owners were using ethanol fuel regularly in 2009, while, the actual number of American FFVs being run on E85 is much lower; surveys conducted in the U.S. have found that 68% of American flex-fuel car owners were not aware they owned an E85 flex. This is thought to be due to a number of factors, including:

The appearance of flex-fuel and non-flex-fuel vehicles is identical;
There is no price difference between a pure-gasoline vehicle and its flex-fuel variant;
The lack of consumer awareness of flex-fuel vehicles;
The lack of promotion of flex-fuel vehicles by American automakers, who often do not label the cars or market them in the same way they do to hybrid cars

By contrast, automakers selling FFVs in Brazil commonly affix badges advertising the car as a flex-fuel vehicle. As of 2007, new FFV models sold in the U.S. were required to feature a yellow gas cap emblazoned with the label "E85/gasoline", in order to remind drivers of the cars' flex-fuel capabilities. Use of E85 in the U.S. is also affected by the relatively low number of E85 filling stations in operation across the country, with just over 1,750 in August 2008, most of which are concentrated in the Corn Belt states, led by Minnesota with 353 stations, followed by Illinois with 181, and Wisconsin with 114. By comparison, there are some 120,000 stations providing regular non-ethanol gasoline in the United States alone.

There have been claims that American automakers are motivated to produce flex-fuel vehicles due to a loophole in the Corporate Average Fuel Economy (CAFE) requirements, which gives the automaker a "fuel economy credit" for every flex-fuel vehicle sold, whether or not the vehicle is actually fueled with E85 in regular use. This loophole allegedly allows the U.S. auto industry to meet CAFE fuel economy targets not by developing more fuel-efficient models, but by spending between US$100 and US$200 extra per vehicle to produce a certain number of flex-fuel models, enabling them to continue selling less fuel-efficient vehicles such as SUVs, which netted higher profit margins than smaller, more fuel-efficient cars.

In the United States, E85 FFVs are equipped with sensor that automatically detect the fuel mixture, signaling the ECU to tune spark timing and fuel injection so that fuel will burn cleanly in the vehicle's internal combustion engine. Originally, the sensors were mounted in the fuel line and exhaust system; more recent models do away with the fuel line sensor. Another feature of older flex-fuel cars is a small separate gasoline storage tank that was used for starting the car on cold days, when the ethanol mixture made ignition more difficult.

Modern Brazilian flex-fuel technology enables FFVs to run an any blend between E20-E25 gasohol and E100 ethanol fuel, using a lambda probe to measure the quality of combustion, which informs the engine control unit as to the exact composition of the gasoline-alcohol mixture. This technology, developed by the Brazilian subsidiary of Bosch in 1994, and further improved and commercially implemented in 2003 by the Italian subsidiary of Magneti Marelli, is known as "Software Fuel Sensor". The Brazilian subsidiary of Delphi Automotive Systems developed a similar technology, known as "Multifuel", based on research conducted at its facility in Piracicaba, São Paulo. This technology allows the controller to regulate the amount of fuel injected and spark time, as fuel flow needs to be decreased to avoid detonation due to the high compression ratio (around 12:1) used by flex-fuel engines.

The first flex motorcycle was launched by Honda in March 2009. Produced by its Brazilian subsidiary Moto Honda da Amazônia, the CG 150 Titan Mix is sold for around US$2,700. Because the motorcycle does not have a secondary gas tank for a cold start like the Brazilian flex cars do, the tank must have at least 20% of gasoline to avoid start up problems at temperatures below 15 °C (59 °F). The motorcycle's panel includes a gauge to warn the driver about the actual ethanol-gasoline mix in the storage tank.

Hybrids

Hybrid electric vehicle

A hybrid vehicle uses multiple propulsion systems to provide motive power. The most common type of hybrid vehicle is the gasoline-electric hybrid vehicles, which use gasoline (petrol) and electric batteries for the energy used to power internal-combustion engines (ICEs) and electric motors. These motors are usually relatively small and would be considered "underpowered" by themselves, but they can provide a normal driving experience when used in combination during acceleration and other maneuvers that require greater power.

The Toyota Prius first went on sale in Japan in 1997 and it is sold worldwide since 2000. By 2017 the Prius is sold in more than 90 countries and regions, with Japan and the United States as its largest markets. In May 2008, global cumulative Prius sales reached the 1 million units, and by September 2010, the Prius reached worldwide cumulative sales of 2 million units, and 3 million units by June 2013. , global hybrid sales are led by the Prius family, with cumulative sales of 6.0361 million units, excluding its plug-in hybrid variant. The Toyota Prius liftback is the leading model of the Toyota brand with cumulative sales of 3.985 million units, followed by the Toyota Aqua/Prius c, with global sales of 1.380 million units, the Prius v/α/+ with 671,200, the Camry Hybrid with 614,700 units, the Toyota Auris with 378,000 units, and the Toyota Yaris Hybrid with 302,700. The best-selling Lexus model is the  Lexus RX 400h/RX 450h with global sales of 363,000 units.

The Honda Insight is a two-seater hatchback hybrid automobile manufactured by Honda. It was the first mass-produced hybrid automobile sold in the United States, introduced in 1999, and produced until 2006. Honda introduced the second-generation Insight in Japan in February 2009, and the new Insight went on sale in the United States on April 22, 2009.  Honda also offers the Honda Civic Hybrid since 2002.

, there are over 50 models of hybrid electric cars available in several world markets, with more than 12 million hybrid electric vehicles sold worldwide since their inception in 1997. , Japan ranked as the market leader with more than 5 million hybrids sold, followed by the United States with cumulative sales of over 4 million units since 1999, and Europe with about 1.5 million hybrids delivered since 2000. Japan has the world's highest hybrid market penetration. By 2013 the hybrid market share accounted for more than 30% of new standard passenger car sold, and about 20% new passenger vehicle sales including kei cars. The Netherlands ranks second with a hybrid market share of 4.5% of new car sales in 2012.

, global sales are by Toyota Motor Company with more than 10 million Lexus and Toyota hybrids sold, followed by Honda Motor Co., Ltd. with cumulative global sales of more than 1.35 million hybrids ; Ford Motor Corporation with over 424 thousand hybrids sold in the United States through June 2015, of which, around 10% are plug-in hybrids; Hyundai Group with cumulative global sales of 200 thousand hybrids , including both Hyundai Motors and Kia Motors hybrid models; and PSA Peugeot Citroën with over 50,000 diesel-powered hybrids sold in Europe through December 2013.

The Elantra LPI Hybrid, launched in the South Korean domestic market in July 2009, is a hybrid vehicle powered by an internal combustion engine built to run on liquefied petroleum gas (LPG) as a fuel. The Elantra PLI is a mild hybrid and the first hybrid to adopt advanced lithium polymer (Li–Poly) batteries.

Plug-in hybrid electric vehicle

Until 2010 most plug-in hybrids on the road in the U.S. were conversions of conventional hybrid electric vehicles, and the most prominent PHEVs were conversions of 2004 or later Toyota Prius, which have had plug-in charging and more batteries added and their electric-only range extended. Chinese battery manufacturer and automaker BYD Auto released the F3DM to the Chinese fleet market in December 2008 and began sales to the general public in Shenzhen in March 2010. General Motors began deliveries of the Chevrolet Volt in the U.S. in December 2010. Deliveries to retail customers of the Fisker Karma began in the U.S. in November 2011.

During 2012, the Toyota Prius Plug-in Hybrid, Ford C-Max Energi, and Volvo V60 Plug-in Hybrid were released. The following models were launched during 2013 and 2015: Honda Accord Plug-in Hybrid, Mitsubishi Outlander P-HEV, Ford Fusion Energi, McLaren P1 (limited edition), Porsche Panamera S E-Hybrid, BYD Qin, Cadillac ELR, BMW i3 REx, BMW i8, Porsche 918 Spyder (limited production), Volkswagen XL1 (limited production), Audi A3 Sportback e-tron, Volkswagen Golf GTE, Mercedes-Benz S 500 e, Porsche Cayenne S E-Hybrid, Mercedes-Benz C 350 e, BYD Tang, Volkswagen Passat GTE, Volvo XC90 T8, BMW X5 xDrive40e, Hyundai Sonata PHEV, and Volvo S60L PHEV.

, about 500,000 highway-capable plug-in hybrid electric cars had been sold worldwide since December 2008, out of total cumulative global sales of 1.2 million light-duty plug-in electric vehicles. , the Volt/Ampera family of  plug-in hybrids, with combined sales of about 134,500 units is the top selling plug-in hybrid in the world. Ranking next are the Mitsubishi Outlander P-HEV with about 119,500, and the Toyota Prius Plug-in Hybrid with almost 78,000.

Pedal-assisted electric hybrid vehicle 

In very small vehicles, the power demand decreases, so human power can be employed to make a significant improvement in battery life.  Three such commercially made vehicles are the Sinclair C5, ELF and TWIKE.

Comparative assessment of fossil and alternative fuels

According to a recent comparative energy and environmental analysis of the vehicle fuel end use (petroleum and natural gas derivatives & hydrogen; biofuels like ethanol or biodiesel, and their mixtures; as well as electricity intended to be used in plug-in electric vehicles), the renewable and non-renewable unit energy costs and  emission cost are suitable indicators for assessing the renewable energy consumption intensity and the environmental impact, and for quantifying the thermodynamic performance of the transportation sector. This analysis allows ranking the energy conversion processes along the vehicle fuels production routes and their end-use, so that the best options for the transportation sector can be determined and better energy policies may be issued. Thus, if a drastic  emissions abatement of the transportation sector is pursued, a more intensive utilization of ethanol in the Brazilian transportation sector mix is advisable. However, as the overall exergy conversion efficiency of the sugar cane industry is still very low, which increases the unit energy cost of ethanol, better production and end-use technologies are required. Nonetheless, with the current scenario of a predominantly renewable Brazilian electricity mix, based on more than 80% of renewable sources, this source consolidates as the most promising energy source to reduce the large amount of greenhouse gas emissions which transportation sector is responsible for.

See also

Alternative Fuels Training Consortium
Alternatives to the automobile
Bi-fuel vehicle
Butanol fuel
Carbon-neutral fuel
Clean Cities
Engine control unit altering to optimize running on different fuels 
Green vehicle
Fuel gas-powered scooter
Hydrogen vehicle
List of hybrid vehicles
Phase-out of fossil fuel vehicles
Renewable energy
Solar vehicle
The Hype about Hydrogen
Vehicle classification by propulsion system
Water-fuelled car
Wind-powered vehicle

References

External links
  Cradle-to-Grave Lifecycle Analysis of U.S. Light-Duty Vehicle-Fuel Pathways: A Greenhouse Gas Emissions and Economic Assessment of Current (2015) and Future (2025–2030) Technologies (includes estimated cost of avoided GHG emissions from different AFV technologies), Argonne National Laboratory, June 2016.
Official website of the Alternative Fuels Data Center, Office of Energy Efficiency and Renewable Energy, United States Department of Energy
 Transitions to Alternative Vehicles and Fuels, National Academy of Sciences (2013)  

Vehicle technology
Green vehicles
Emerging technologies
Alternative fuels